Atikaya was the son of Ravana and his second wife Dhanyamalini in the Ramayana epic. 

His powers are explained by Vibhishan himself in Ramayana. Once while filled with rage, he tried to uproot the Chakravalgiri mountain. Lord Shiva noticed this and hurled his trident at him, but Atikaya was so powerful at that time that he caught the trident midair like a toy and started laughing. Lord Shiva was so impressed by the demon that he taught all the secrets of archery to him. Due to armour of Lord Brahma given to him, Atikaya had to be slain by Lakshmana by using a Brahmastra, a powerful weapon of the god Brahma. The wind-god Vayu at the behest of the god Indra, revealed to Lakshmana the secret that an otherwise invincible armour of Lord Brahma was granted to Atikaya, that could only be pierced by a Brahmastra.

Atikaya and his uncle Kumbhakarna are believed to be incarnations of the demons Madhu and Kaitabha, who were slayed by Parabramha Lord Shree Vishnu at the creation of the world. In another instance, Kumbhakarna said to the incarnation of Vishnu's cursed gatekeeper Vijaya.

References

Rakshasa in the Ramayana
Characters_in_the_Ramayana
Mythological archers